Deconstructing Beck is a compilation album released on February 17, 1998 by an anonymous group posing as Illegal Art. The album is a compilation of 13 tracks created completely from samples of American musician Beck which, by artistic intention of the group, were not approved by Geffen Records, and its release set off a large scale legal battle between the two record labels which attracted worldwide media attention. According to cultural critic Steven Shaviro, the release of Deconstructing Beck served as a challenge to the music industry since Beck's discography prominently features samples, and paved the way for new media art that became oriented around the limitations of copyright law.

Background and legacy
Deconstructing Beck is a compilation of 13 tracks created by various artists. The album was produced by the anonymous sample recording label named Illegal Art which was created by an anonymous person(s) calling himself/herself/themselves Philo T. Farnsworth. The album is, as a whole, created completely out of samples taken, intentionally without authorization or payment, from Beck's discography; when the release of the album was announced in February 1998, Illegal Art made great efforts to inform Beck's lawyers. Beck's lawyers immediately threatened to sue on the grounds of copyright infringement which resulted in a high-profile controversy, but Beck's lawyers and publicist were never able to take legal action since the identity of Philo T. and the actual location of Illegal Art were both anonymous.

Reappraisal by Steven Shaviro
Cultural critic Steven Shaviro's article "Deconstructing Beck" uses the album as an avant-garde turning point regarding the use of appropriation and sampling in the music industry today. Shaviro's article takes issue with the legalities of sound/image ownership and copyrights. Shaviro's utilization of the controversy surrounding Beck and Deconstructing Beck bring questions such as "who owns the images and sounds around us?" and "what does it mean to own a sound?" to the surface. Beck's own music is created from various beats and rhythms of all different genres of music from multiple artists. However, Beck's recording company Geffen financially backs Beck and is able to pay the royalty and copyright fees of the samples Beck utilizes in his own songs. Since Beck's songs are paid for and legal he is considered "eclectic" and an artist of appropriation. However, those who do not have record label support and cannot afford copyright fees and continue to appropriate others' music are seen as thieves and criminals. This issue calls into question the issue of music ownership. Since recording companies leverage the money for copyright fees and serve as "watch dogs" over their clients' work, do they ultimately own music? This situation also leads the reader to question how these copyright legalities limit artist creativity and at what point is a song considered brand new? "As the contrast between Beck and Deconstructing Beck suggests, the practice of sampling can take many different forms and has a wide range of implications and meanings.

Track listing

References

Further reading 
 Shaviro, Steven. Connected. University of Minnesota Press, 2003

External links 
 Deconstructing Beck at Illegal Art

1998 remix albums
Anonymous musical compositions
Tribute albums
Sampling controversies
Beck